Eodorcadion kaznakovi is a species of beetle in the family Cerambycidae. It was described by Suvorov in 1912.

Subspecies
 Eodorcadion kaznakovi kaznakovi (Suvorov, 1912)
 Eodorcadion kaznakovi zhilini Lin & Danilevsky, 2011

References

Dorcadiini
Beetles described in 1912